Theodore Andrus Reynolds (born October 8, 1938) is an American science fiction writer.

Two of his works were nominated for Hugo Awards in 1980: "Can These Bones Live?" for Best Short Story, and Ker-Plop for Best Novella. His only novel, The Tides of God (1989), concerns millennialism being inspired by extraterrestrials.

He was one of the winners of The Village Voices "Sci-Fi Scenes" writing contest, held in 1980–81; the newspaper published his untitled story of (as the contest rules demanded) exactly 250 words.

He largely stopped writing in 1996 but, after retirement, resumed in 2010.

Bibliography

Short fiction 

Stories

References

The Encyclopedia of Science Fiction, page 1007

External links
Audiobook of KER-PLOP

1938 births
Living people
20th-century American male writers
20th-century American novelists
20th-century American short story writers
American male novelists
American male short story writers
American science fiction writers
Analog Science Fiction and Fact people
Asimov's Science Fiction people
Place of birth missing (living people)